Lodzer Naje Folkscajtung ("Łódź New People's Newspaper") was a Yiddish-language daily newspaper in interbellum Poland, published in Łódź. Lodzer Naje Folkscajtung was an organ of the General Jewish Labour Bund in Poland.

References

Bundism in Europe
Defunct newspapers published in Poland
Jewish anti-Zionism in Poland
Jews and Judaism in Łódź
Mass media in Łódź
Publications with year of establishment missing
Publications with year of disestablishment missing
Socialism in Poland
Yiddish-language mass media in Poland
Yiddish socialist newspapers
Daily newspapers published in Poland